Slobodka is a rural locality (a village) in Gorkinskoye Rural Settlement, Kirzhachsky District, Vladimir Oblast, Russia. The population was 17 as of 2010. There are 4 streets.

Geography 
Slobodka is located 18 km north of Kirzhach (the district's administrative centre) by road. Bardovo is the nearest rural locality.

References 

Rural localities in Kirzhachsky District